A Shape of Light (stylized in all lowercase; also known by its full title A Shape of Light: A Silent Voice The Movie Original Soundtrack) is a soundtrack album by Japanese EBM musician and composer Kensuke Ushio, which serves as the official movie soundtrack for Japanese animation movie A Silent Voice.

The soundtrack contains 61 tracks on two CDs and has a running-time of about two hours. The album was released on September 14, 2016, via Pony Canyon. A western release was done in 2017 by Anime Limited in English-speaking countries and Europe. The vinyl version is known as Shape B and has the same track listing but with a different cover.

A Shape of Light peaked at no. 74 on the Japanese Albums Chart where it lasted for about five weeks in the rankings.

Production history 
Kensuke Ushio who creates EBM music under his moniker agraph. was announced to be the soundtrack's composer in May 2016 after he got asked to write the music for Kyoto Animation's anime movie A Silent Voice back in 2015.

Most of the tracks were composed by Ushio himself while all tracks called inv are based on the Invention No. 1 in C major, BWV 772 originally composed by Johann Sebastian Bach. Ushio worked alongside movie director Naoko Yamada which had a very similar point of view when it came across the concept of the film and music. Kensuke Ushio described the movie as Shōya's story that deals about his contacts with other people and how treats them, which was a universal theme when it came to bring it out of context. For working on the film's music Ushio was shown several scenarios. He stated that he put full effort in the recordings of the sounds.

The movie soundtrack was recorded at the Maruni Studio in Tokyo, Japan. The track slt featured guest musician Yuji Katsui on violin. The mixing of the first disc was done by Hiroshi Kitashiro, while Ushio mixed the second CD himself. The mastering was done at Kimken Studio, Tochigi, Japan.

In an interview Ushio stated he had not really worked on film scores that often before working on A Silent Voice's soundtrack. Yamada, who was familiar with Ushio's music, contacted his management requesting his involvement in composing the soundtrack. The work on the film's score began when most parts of the storyboard had to be elaborated. The studio works ended when sound director Yuta Tsuruoka got the final musical concept and approved it.

Background 
Ushio wrote 82 tracks in total for the soundtrack. 61 made it on the official soundtrack while 50 tracks are listenable during the movie. Most of the tracks are written for piano.

The tracks' titles on the first CD consist of three letters, with exceptions of the inv titles, van(var), lvs(var) and lit(var). The three -letter titles are identification codes created by Ushio himself while composing the titles and which he got feedback for. Ushio decided that he would use his identification codes as song names instead of renaming them in order to tell the listener their possible meanings. Instead he wanted the listeners to come up with their own interpretations.

Even though those codes are not arbitrary. So htb on the first CD stands for heart beat which is the first track on the second CD and another version of that track. Ushio describes the inv tracks as the most important songs on the soundtrack. He stated that Bach's Invention is splitable in three parts as well as the movie's plot why every part got some inv tracks on it.

Regarding the movie the inv title and their adaptions is an example of learning how to communicate and how Shōya made it throughout the movie to overcome his guilt in Elementary School and how he invented a new way of communication. At the final scene on the movie where Shōya and Shōko are seen visiting the Highschool's culture festival the final part of Bach's Invention is played symbolising the end of Shōya's lesson in communication.

lit which is only played two times throughout the whole movie stands for Light. Ushio stated the movie is about reaching the light which is why the songs was played at the very end of the film.

Critical reception 
James Marsh of South China Morning Post wrote that the discordant sounding score by Ushio lays an unsettling layer on the complex sounding landscape of the film which brings the viewer nearer to Shōko Nishimiyas world's view. In a movie review at Anime News Network Kevin Cirugeda wrote that Kensuke Ushio and Naoko Yamada worked closely together on the soundtrack resulting – excluding the licensed "My Generation" by The Who – in gentle piano sounds, ambient sounds and pure silence. There are no significant tracks instead the films as whole was described as a sensory experience where the sounds play as such of a role like the background music used in the movie.

Readers of Anime UK News voted the soundtrack as Best Soundtrack at the Anime UK Reader's Choice Awards alongside the musical score of The Ancient Magus' Bride.

Commercial performance 
The soundtrack peaked at no. 74 in the Japanese Albums Chart in the week of September 14, 2016, staying for five weeks on the chart.

Track listing

Release history

References 

2016 albums
Animated film soundtracks
Anime soundtracks
Electronic body music albums